Manish Naggdev is an Indian television actor. He is known for portraying the role of Chinu on Banoo Main Teri Dulhann and Adarsh Thakur in Begusarai. In 2018, he starred as Aakash on Udaan.

Career
Manish started his TV career in 2007, when he booked the recurring role of Chinu on Banoo Main Teri Dulhann. In the same year, he starred on Santaan as Nishant.
In 2013, he joined Pavitra Rishta. In the same year, he appeared in an episode of Savdhaan India. In 2018, he appeared as a guest on  Bigg Boss season 12. In the same year, he was cast on Colors TV show Udaan (2014 TV series) as Akash, a negative character.

Personal life
Manish was born to Sadna Naggdev in India. He has a younger sister, Kiran Naggdev. He got engaged to his girlfriend, Malika Juneja on June 8, 2022 and tied the knot in the same year on October 14.

Filmography

Television and films
2007-09 Banoo Main Teri Dulhann as Cheenu
2007-09 Santaan as Nishant
2008-09 Hum Ladkiyan as Alap
2009-10 Rehna Hai Teri Palkon Ki Chhaon Mein as Tanmay
2010-11 Geet – Hui Sabse Parayi as Gurvinder
2010-11 Dil Se Diya Vachan as Mayank
2012 Madhubala – Ek Ishq Ek Junoon as Mukund Dixit
2013 Savdhaan India
2013-14 Pavitra Rishta as Shashank Kamble
2014-15 Box Cricket League as contestant
2016 Begusarai as Adarsh Thakur
2018 Bigg Boss 12 as a guest
2018-2019 Udaan as Aakash
2019 The Gift - Short Film as Sid
2020 Wish You Were Here - Webisodes 2021 Main Tujhmain - Music video
2022 Cyber Vaar''

Awards

References

External links 

Living people
Indian male soap opera actors
Indian male television actors
Male actors from Mumbai
21st-century Indian male actors
1984 births